Giulio Piazza (1663–1726) was a Roman Catholic cardinal.

Biography
On 22 Dec 1697, he was consecrated bishop by Gasparo Carpegna, Cardinal-Priest of Santa Maria in Trastevere, with Gregorio Giuseppe Gaetani de Aragonia, Titular Patriarch of Alexandria, and Antonio Spinelli, Bishop of Melfi e Rapolla, serving as co-consecrators.

Episcopal succession

References 

1663 births
1726 deaths
18th-century Italian cardinals
Apostolic Nuncios to Cologne
Apostolic Nuncios to Poland
Apostolic Nuncios to Switzerland
Apostolic Nuncios to Belgium
Apostolic Nuncios to the Holy Roman Empire
People from Forlì